Mučanj (Serbian Cyrillic: Мучањ) is a mountain in western Serbia, near the town of Ivanjica.

Gallery

References

Mountains of Serbia